Wong Kwok-hing  BBS MH  (Vietnamese : Vương Quốc Hưng ; born 29 March 1949, Haiphong, North Vietnam) is a Hong Kong trade unionist and a former member of the Legislative Council of Hong Kong, representing the New Territories West constituency from 2008 to 2012, and representing the Hong Kong Island from 2012 to 2016.


Biography
Wong is a member of Hong Kong Federation of Trade Unions and was one of the 52 founding members of the Democratic Alliance for the Betterment and Progress of Hong Kong, which is the largest party and trade unions of the Pro-Beijing camp. He was previously a member of Eastern District Council for the Provident constituency.

Wong strongly opposed the filibuster, which was mostly led by four LegCo members of People Power and League of Social Democrats then. He wrote big words on the paper in the chamber to protest against them.

References

External links
 Wong Kwok-hing's Blog 阿王手記

Recipients of the Bronze Bauhinia Star
1949 births
District councillors of Eastern District
Members of the Urban Council of Hong Kong
Hong Kong columnists
Living people
Hong Kong trade unionists
Democratic Alliance for the Betterment and Progress of Hong Kong politicians
Hoa people
Vietnamese emigrants to Hong Kong
Hong Kong people of Hoa descent
Hong Kong Federation of Trade Unions
People from Haiphong
HK LegCo Members 2004–2008
HK LegCo Members 2008–2012
HK LegCo Members 2012–2016
Jinan University alumni
Members of the Selection Committee of Hong Kong
Members of the Election Committee of Hong Kong, 2017–2021